About Hewad Group

Hewad is an independent Afghan public media group made of an International TV network, Radio, and Production, established by Mr. Qayoom Karzai in 2006 in Kandahar. Hewad was first established as a Local TV network meanwhile catching many viewers’ attention for its demo broadcasts. Then, Hewad became a Satellite TV and Radio broadcaster in 2015. Today it is holding the satellite status with a high-quality broadcasting program all over Afghanistan, including 43 Asian Countries.

Hewad TV is famous for its various programs (news bulletins, social and political programs, and movies dubbed in Pashto). Its transmission is top ranked in Kandahar and Afghanistan as well as for Afghan audiences in neighboring countries. Hewad TV viewers make positive compliments about the staff members. 

Hewad claimed the top spot in every key rating measure in the southern zone. According to Altai national Survey, 68% of viewers in this region are watching Hewad international Television which means Hewad TV is first in audience ranking compared to other media broadcasters.  Of note, It's a pleasure to get this honer and Hewad have been trying to maintain this status so far.

Mission statement

Hewad's mission is to enhance public access to critical information, promote civic media and democracy under the rules of Islamic and Afghan Culture, freedom of speech and open discourse, protect women and children's rights, educate young talents, advance Afghan Culture and raise public awareness through its extensive network of TV, Radio, and Production. Hewad is largely self-sustainable through public communication contracts and advertising sales which go back into project development and capacity building.

Neutrality

The group's editorial policy embraces one main concept: Afghan ownership of Afghanistan's process, respecting Islamic and Afghan Cultural Values and is committed to one principle: people's right to be informed and to be heard, which is the basis for good governance, accountability and transparency. To fulfill the concept and the principle we are forging a Hewad focus and style, ruled by high quality, without any discrimination, in-depth, timely, accurate and balanced reporting together with a creative selection of story-ideas.

Broadcasting Programs

Hewad Radio and TV operate the unique blend of public service-oriented programming (cultural, political, economic, developmental and educational programs including VOX POP, Peoples’ comments), news “News Bulletin each hour and Three News Hours Daily”, entertainment and music reaches millions of viewers and listeners 24/7.

Team Structure

Hewad Radio and TV staff (Reporters and Producers) structure is designed based on the following fundamental rules.

·        Hewad Radio and TV manager, reporters and producers must have Afghan Nationality.

·        The staff members must have a BA Degree in Journalism or at least two years of experience in the relevant field.

·        Hewad Radio and TV staff (Male and Female) should have the ability to speak and write the two official languages (Pashto and Dari) fluently.

Hewad Radio (88 FM)

Hewad Radio is the first independent radio channel in the southern region which was established 13 years ago under the name of “Aghan Azada Radio” in Kandahar province.

The radio is now a part of Hewad Group. It broadcasts several programs 24/7 which are concurrently reachable in all over the world through the internet (hewadradio.myl2mr.com) these days. 

The well-organized management; skilled broadcasting and technical staff; and efficient transmitter, has allowed Hewad Radio to broadcast 35 various religious, political, social, literary, entertaining, informational and sports-related programs in all 17 districts of Kandahar province.

Furthermore, Hewad Radio as a crucial part of Hewad Group, substantially serves to convey your advertisements and reports to the people through its publication and also accepts the sponsorships of yours. Meanwhile, as Hewad TV, it also offers 20% discount in all advertisements.

It's to be mentioned that Hewad Radio was announced having the ample listeners than any other Radio after credible research was conducted in Kandahar province last year.

Hewad Production

Hewad production is another significant part of Hewad Group which was set up after employing experienced male and female staff in 2014.

Besides providing various video broadcasting programs and debates for Hewad TV, Hewad Production standardly carries on the responsibilities of dubbing the Hollywood and Bollywood movies, creating commercial ads by using the latest graphics programs, recording and editing the conferences, meetings, gatherings, presentations and workshops held by public authorities and private sectors and help Hewad Radio in case of audio services.

It's worth saying that Hewad Production has gained fame and numerous fans in Afghanistan and all over the world by providing such services

Hewad Radio Television Coverage

Hewad TV Satellite Coverage: Yahsat ۱A is located at 52.5° east covering the Middle East, North Africa, Southwest Asia and Europe

Hewad TV Local Coverage: 2KW Transmitter with 40m tower for local broadcast in Kandahar province

Hewad Radio Coverage: 1 KW Transmitter with 36m tower for local broadcast in Kandahar province along with online web broadcast: hewadradio.myl2mr.com

:Frequency

Hewad TV can be tuned at

Yahsat: 1A, Frequency: 12015, Symbol rate: 27500, FEC: ¾, Polarization: H

Official Website Link

[./http://www.hewad.tv/]
Watch Hewad TV Live

Television stations in Afghanistan
Pashto mass media
Pashto-language television stations
Television channels and stations established in 2006
Mass media in Kandahar